Ningling Ge ( or ; 1032–1048) was a crown prince of the Western Xia dynasty and the fourth son of the Emperor Jingzong, the founding monarch. Ningling Ge was a member of Tangut Weiming (嵬名) clan.

"Ningling" (寧令,) was his Tangut title, which meant "Grand Prince", while "Ge" (哥) was his personal name.

Life 
Ge was born in 1032 to empress Yeli. He had also one elder brother, Ning Ming (寧明, "Prince Ming") and one younger brother, Xili (錫狸).

In 1042, Ge's elder brother Ning Ming was murdered by Yuanhao for confessing taoism. Another brother, Xili, died prematurely. Anxious about subsequent deaths of the princes, Emperor Jingzong appointed Ge as Crown Prince. Ge was favoured by his father for his talents, force and beautiful appearance. Yuanhao had high hopes for his son, henceforth prepared him for the succession. However, Ge presented rather pacifism and did not support aggressive and highly expensive foreign policy.

Yuanhao once took his son on the battlefield during the war with the Song dynasty. Ge was hurt by an arrow on the battlefield and brought by Western Xia general Muoyi Jieshan to his house for recuperation. When Ge woke up, he saw a girl staying near the bed, who was revealed to be a daughter of Jieshan. The prince tried to grip the girl but she shyly hid behind the curtain. Ge came closer to the girl. From that on, they developed an intimate relationship. After the recovery Ge knelt so as to seek agreement for the marriage with general Muoyi's daughter. Both Jieshan and lady Muoyi supported Ge's desire. Lady Muoyi was bestowed a title of Crown Princess.

In 1047, Empress Xiancheng, lady Yeli, was demoted to a commoner and turned to nunnery due to machinations of lady Mozang, sister of Mozang Epang. Lady Mozang had framed his mother for a romance with the official Buxiqi Duosi (补細乞多巳), using the hand of Yeli Yuqi, brother of Empress Yeli. Lady Mozang and Mozang Epang still plotted to harm Lady Yeli's son and support succession of Lady Mozang's son, Ningling Liangcha despite his age (Liangcha was several months old and therefore was unable to rule on his own).

In 1048, Emperor Jingzong seduced Ningling Ge's wife, lady Muoyi (沒移氏) and conferred upon her a title of Empress. Ge's mother's maternal clansmen and Epang instructed Ge to kill the emperor so as support his later ascension to the throne. On 19 January 1048, Ningling Ge broke down into the chamber of Li Yuanhao, seizing the opportunity of the drunken state of his father. The only action Ge manage to undertake was chopping out Yuanhao's nose. Ningling Ge went for backup to Mozang Epang because of being  frightened of his murder. Epang betrayed his accomplice by turning him an assassin, which led to the execution of the crown prince. Li Yuanhao was able to survive an attempt of assassination, however succumbed of his wounds two days later.

Ningling Ge was executed for assassination by Mozang Epang and didn't receive any posthumous name customary for crown princes who failed to ascend to the imperial throne.

Family 
Father: Li Yuanhao
Mother: Empress Xiancheng (憲成皇后野利氏), lady Yeli
Spouse: Crown Princess, Lady Muoyi (沒移氏)

References 

Tanguts
Western Xia people
11th-century Tangut people
Executed Western Xia people
Patricides